CIER-TV was a low-power community television station in Ear Falls, Ontario, Canada, which began broadcasting in the early 1980s. The station was licensed by the Canadian Radio-television and Telecommunications Commission before 1984.

CIER-TV was owned and operated by a local television broadcaster, Ear Falls TV Committee, who also rebroadcasts a small selection of broadcast and cable channels via low-powered VHF/UHF translators. The station aired two hours per week of local programming, such as locally produced programming, news events and community updates, township council meetings, interviews, tournaments, and recreational activities.

On January 30, 2012, the CRTC revoked CIER-TV's licence at the request of the station; the licences of the Ear Falls TV Committee's other repeaters are known to be cancelled.

References

External links
CIER-TV History - Canadian Communications Foundation
 

IER
IER
Canadian community channels
Television channels and stations disestablished in 2012
IER
Television channels and stations established in 1984
1984 establishments in Ontario
2012 disestablishments in Ontario
IER-TV